Witchcraft is the debut album from the Swedish doom metal band Witchcraft. The album was released in 2004 by Rise Above Records. "Please Don't Forget Me" and "Yes I Do" are both covers of 70s-era Pentagram. "Yes I Do" appears on the original LP version and the Japanese press; it does not appear on the picture disc. "Please Don't Forget Me" is credited to Bobby Liebling on the sleeve and is often mis-accredited to Liebling's pre-Pentagram outfit, Stone Bunny. The cover image is a slightly altered version of a print called Merlin, a pen-and-ink drawing by Aubrey Beardsley for an 1893-94 edition of Sir Thomas Malory's Le Morte d'Arthur.  Additionally, the band formed to be a one-off tribute band to both Bobby Liebling and Roky Erickson and only intended to make one song (No Angel or Demon) however, they continued and are now an original band.

Track listing
 "Witchcraft" – 6:00
 "The Snake" – 2:48
 "Please Don't Forget Me" (Liebling) – 2:13
 "Lady Winter" – 2:58
 "What I Am" – 3:45
 "Schyssta lögner" – 1:57
 "No Angel or Demon" – 3:28
 "I Want You to Know" – 3:16
 "It's So Easy" – 3:53
 "You Bury Your Head" – 4:40
 "Her Sisters They Were Weak" – 6:00
 "Yes I Do" (Liebling) - 2:34 (Vinyl & Japan-only bonus track)

References

External links
 

2004 albums
Witchcraft (band) albums
Rise Above Records albums